Italy competed at the 1932 Summer Olympics in Los Angeles, United States. 112 competitors, all men, took part in 61 events in 13 sports.

Medalists

Athletics

Results

Boxing

Cycling

Ten cyclists, all men, represented Italy in 1932.

Individual road race
 Attilio Pavesi
 Guglielmo Segato
 Giuseppe Olmo
 Giovanni Cazzulani

Team road race
 Attilio Pavesi
 Guglielmo Segato
 Giuseppe Olmo

Sprint
 Bruno Pellizzari

Time trial
 Luigi Consonni

Team pursuit
 Marco Cimatti
 Paolo Pedretti
 Alberto Ghilardi
 Nino Borsari

Fencing

14 fencers, all men, represented Italy in 1932.

Men's foil
 Gustavo Marzi
 Giulio Gaudini
 Gioacchino Guaragna

Men's team foil
 Giulio Gaudini, Gioacchino Guaragna, Gustavo Marzi, Ugo Pignotti, Rodolfo Terlizzi, Giorgio Pessina

Men's épée
 Giancarlo Cornaggia-Medici
 Carlo Agostoni
 Saverio Ragno

Men's team épée
 Carlo Agostoni, Franco Riccardi, Renzo Minoli, Saverio Ragno, Giancarlo Cornaggia-Medici

Men's sabre
 Giulio Gaudini
 Arturo De Vecchi
 Emilio Salafia

Men's team sabre
 Gustavo Marzi, Giulio Gaudini, Renato Anselmi, Emilio Salafia, Arturo De Vecchi, Ugo Pignotti

Gymnastics

Modern pentathlon

Three male pentathletes represented Italy in 1932.

 Carlo Simonetti
 Eugenio Pagnini
 Francesco Pacini

Rowing

Sailing

Shooting

Six shooters represented Italy in 1932, winning a gold and bronze medal in the 25 m pistol event.

25 m rapid fire pistol
 Renzo Morigi
 Domenico Matteucci
 Walter Boninsegni

50 m rifle, prone
 Mario Zorzi
 Ugo Cantelli
 Amedeo Bruni

Swimming

Weightlifting

Wrestling

Art competitions

References

External links
Official Olympic Reports
International Olympic Committee results database
 

Nations at the 1932 Summer Olympics
1932
1932 in Italian sport